The Bengal Natural History Museum is a museum in Darjeeling, West Bengal, that exhibits a vast range of natural artifacts and fossils. The museum is home to 820 specimens of over 400 species of birds including 110 species of eggs, 35 species of snakes and 57 species of fish.

History 
The Bengal Natural History Museum was established in 1903 as a small museum in the premises of the Lloyd Botanical Garden under the orders of the then Governor-General of India, Mr. George Nathaniel Curzon. Due to increasing visitors and growing collections, the museum was shifted to its present location in 1915, and the Bengal Natural History Museum was formally formed in 1923. Initially the museum was managed by the Bengal Natural Museum Society from 1923 to 1976. Later it was handed over to West Bengal Forest Department.

See also 
 Natural history museum
 List of natural history museums
 List of museums in West Bengal

References

Museums in West Bengal
Natural history museums in India